Vivo Nex is a smartphone that features a different design from traditional smartphones, as it has a mechanical pop-up camera.

References  

Android (operating system) devices
Vivo smartphones
Chinese brands
Mobile phones introduced in 2018
Phablets
Mobile phones with multiple rear cameras
Mobile phones with 4K video recording
Discontinued smartphones